Action Without Borders (also known as Idealist) is a non-profit service organization based in New York City, founded in 1995 by Ami Dar. The group has offices in the United States and Argentina.

History

Founder Ami Dar was interested in solving social and environmental problems in the world since childhood.

In 1985, after his mandatory army service in the Israeli Defense Forces, while Dar was traveling in South America, he got the idea to use modern technology (phones, PCs, and fax machines) to build a network that would make it easier for people to connect and act on issue that concerned them. Dar was 24 at the time.

In 1988, Dar returned to Israel. He worked as a waiter, a translator, and a marketing manager for a software company, Aladdin Knowledge Systems (AKS), based in Tel Aviv. In 1992, he relocated to New York City to establish the North American branch of AKS. He also learned about the World Wide Web.

In 1994, during his tenure with AKS, Dar began the organization as the Contact Center Network, a community point located on the Upper West Side of Manhattan. Dar’s intention was to create a network of meeting spaces in different communities, where people could connect with neighbors who might share interests and ideas for local action.

To promote the Contact Center Network, Dar established a website (www.contact.org), a simple static HTML website with 2,500 links to the websites of nonprofit organizations in 100 countries and all 50 U.S. states. Dar set out to find every nonprofit organization on the Web and arrange the sites by topic and geographic location, to create a ‘virtual’ Contact Network Center, which launched in the fall of 1995.

In summer 1996, Contact Center Network was relaunched as Idealist.org (an "idea list" for idealists). Idealist.org developed into a searchable database where organizations could post. This system allowed organizations to post and update detailed information about their services, volunteer opportunities, job openings, internships, upcoming events, and any material or publication they produced. Small seed grants from the AT&T Foundation, Markle, and Packard foundations helped sustain and expand the website.

In 1997, the Contact Center Network was renamed Action Without Borders (AWB) as Idealist.org reached the milestone of having 10,000 nonprofit organizations registered on the site.

In 1998, Idealist began offering email alerts so that people could get notified about new opportunities posted to the site. The next year, Idealist.org began charging US-based organizations $40 to post jobs (up until then, all listings had been free). Service Employees International Union was the first organization to pay for a job listing.

In 2001, Idealist launched the Spanish-language website Idealistas.org; the French-language site Idéaliste.org followed in 2003. In 2004, Idealist began its first iteration of the Idealist Graduate Degree Fairs. In 2005, the Portland, Oregon, office opened.

In 2016, Idealist closed its Portland, Oregon office, laying off two-dozen people who worked there.

See also 
 Community service
 Civic engagement

References

Charities based in New York City
Organizations established in 1995
Social networks for social change
Employment social networks
Internet-based activism
1995 establishments in New York City